Perry Drug Stores was an American retail pharmacy chain founded in 1957 in the city of Pontiac, Michigan, United States. At its peak in the 1980s, Perry operated more than 200 drug stores, primarily in the state of Michigan, as well as 200 Auto Works auto parts stores and fourteen A. L. Price discount health and beauty aids outlets. In 1995, Perry Drug Stores was bought out by Rite Aid, a pharmacy chain based in Camp Hill, Pennsylvania. The Perry chain, which at the time comprised 224 stores, was the largest acquisition ever made by Rite Aid. In addition, this acquisition brought the Rite Aid name to the Detroit area for the first time.

History

Founder Jack A. Robinson opened his first Perry Drug Store in 1957 on Perry Street in Pontiac, Michigan.  Over time, the chain expanded to become a prominent drugstore in the Detroit area, competing with local chains such as Arbor Drugs and Cunningham Drug.

In 1978, a prototype Perry store was opened, featuring an expanded sporting goods line, a home and automotive center, and live pets for sale. Auto Works, an automotive parts retail chain, was introduced in 1982.

Twenty-six Cunningham Drug locations were spun off by the chain's owner into a new chain called Apex Drug. By 1985, the Apex Drug locations and several other Cunningham locations were acquired by Perry, while the Cunningham locations in Florida remained in operation.

In 1981, Perry Drug expanded into the Chicago, Illinois market for the first time. (The chain had previously tried to enter Chicago through a failed acquisition of DeKoven Drugs.) A year later, these stores were sold to businessmen Fred Barney and Bill Cartwright, two veteran businessmen who formed the Chicago operations into Perry Drug Chicago.

Several units in Michigan were acquired in 1990 from Revco. This acquisition made Perry the dominant drugstore chain in the Detroit area and expanded Perry's presence to the Upper Peninsula for the first time.

1990s: Sale to Rite Aid
Perry Drug Stores posted a brief period of sharp declines in sales in 1990, with locations in Indiana and Wisconsin being sold off. By 1993, the Perry Drug Chicago locations were re-acquired and liquidated.

After its out-of-state operations were sold, Perry continued to expand its presence within Michigan. Many locations were remodeled to the chain's "store of the '90s" format; in addition, an online computer system called PerryLink was implemented at all stores, allowing for customers to have their prescriptions filled at any location.

Rite Aid, a drugstore chain based in Camp Hill, Pennsylvania, acquired twenty-five locations from Hook's Drug Stores in 1994, subsequently selling nine of the locations to Perry. One year later, Rite Aid acquired all 224 of Perry Drug Stores' locations, including the former Hook's Drugs locations. The acquisition of Perry Drug Stores in 1995 was the largest acquisition made by Rite Aid. It also brought Rite Aid to the Detroit area, where it previously had no stores.

Other operations
In addition to the drugstore chain, Perry owned two other specialty chains: Auto Works and A.L. Price. Auto Works was an automotive store which comprised more than 200 locations at its peak. This chain was sold off in 1988 to Northern Automotive (now known as CSK Auto). A.L Price was a deep-discount health and beauty aids retailer with fourteen locations in the Detroit area. In 1990, Perry Drug Stores sold off all fourteen A. L. Price locations, as part of a decision to focus entirely on the drugstore chain itself; three years later, eleven of these stores were re-acquired by Perry.

References

Rite Aid
Retail companies disestablished in 1995
Companies based in Oakland County, Michigan
Retail companies established in 1957
Defunct pharmacies of the United States
Defunct companies based in Michigan
Pontiac, Michigan
1957 establishments in Michigan
1995 disestablishments in Michigan
Health care companies based in Michigan
1995 mergers and acquisitions